HMAS Encounter is a Royal Australian Navy (RAN) naval base located in Birkenhead, South Australia. Initially in operation between 1965 and 1994, the base was recomissioned by Chief of the Navy, Vice Admiral Michael Noonan, on 28 May 2022.

Formerly HMAS Torrens commissioned in August 1940 before being commissioned as HMAS Encounter in 1965.

With the base closure in June 1994, a Navy Support Office South Australia, later Navy Headquarters-SA (NHQ-SA) was established in Keswick Barracks. As a result of the growing importance of South Australian shipbuilding and the growth in RAN personnel in South Australia, HMAS Encounter was recommissioned in May 2022 with initial accommodation at Keswick Barracks and to be relocated to accommodation in Osborne, South Australia at a later time.

See also
Encounter (disambiguation)

References

External links
 NHQ South Australia
 HMAS Encounter (I)

Encounter
1994 disestablishments in Australia
1939 establishments in Australia
Military units and formations established in 1939
Lefevre Peninsula